Christophe Leclercq (born 24 February 1967) is a French politician from En Marche. He was elected Member of Parliament for Pas-de-Calais's 6th constituency in a by-election in 2021 to replace Brigitte Bourguignon.

References 

Living people
1967 births
Deputies of the 15th National Assembly of the French Fifth Republic

La République En Marche! politicians
21st-century French politicians
Members of Parliament for Pas-de-Calais